This is a list of candidates for the 1880 New South Wales colonial election. The election was held from 17 November to 2 December 1880.

There was no recognisable party structure at this election.

Retiring Members
William Davies (Argyle)
James Greenwood (East Sydney)
John Hurley (b 1796) (Narellan)
William Long (Parramatta)
John Lucas (Canterbury)
John Macintosh (East Sydney)
James Merriman (West Sydney)
Henry Moses (Hawkesbury)
John Murphy (Monaro)
Arthur Onslow (Camden)
Colin Simson (Balranald)

Legislative Assembly
Sitting members are shown in bold text. Successful candidates are highlighted.

Electorates are arranged chronologically from the day the poll was held. Because of the sequence of polling, some sitting members who were defeated in their constituencies were then able to contest other constituencies later in the polling period. On the second occasion, these members are shown in italic text.

See also
 Members of the New South Wales Legislative Assembly, 1880–1882

References
 

1880